The 2017 Dafabet Scottish Open was a professional ranking snooker tournament that took place from 11 to 17 December 2017 at the Emirates Arena in Glasgow, Scotland. It was the twelfth ranking event of the 2017/2018 season and a part of the Home Nations Series.

Marco Fu was the defending champion, but he lost 4–3 to Xiao Guodong in the last 16.

Neil Robertson won the tournament, coming from 4–8 down to win 9–8 in the final against Cao Yupeng. Aside from making it to the final, Cao also made the tournament's highest break, his first professional maximum in the third frame of his first round match against Andrew Higginson.

Prize fund
The breakdown of prize money for this year is shown below:

 Winner: £70,000
 Runner-up: £30,000
 Semi-final: £20,000
 Quarter-final: £10,000
 Last 16: £6,000
 Last 32: £3,500
 Last 64: £2,500

 Highest break: £2,000
 Total: £366,000

The "rolling 147 prize" for a maximum break stood at £20,000

Main draw

Qualifying round
 Ross Vallance 4–2  Robert Carlisle

Top half

Section 1

Section 2

Section 3

Section 4

Bottom half

Section 5

Section 6

Section 7

Section 8

Finals

Final

Century breaks
A total of 73 century breaks were made during the competition.

 147  Cao Yupeng
 144, 138, 117, 113, 109, 108, 105  John Higgins
 144, 122, 114  Noppon Saengkham
 143, 138, 135, 132, 128, 124, 118, 117, 114, 113, 102  Neil Robertson
 140, 129, 102  Judd Trump
 136, 112, 103, 101  Ronnie O'Sullivan
 135, 122, 104  Ding Junhui
 130  Liang Wenbo
 129  Tom Ford
 127, 126  Michael White
 125, 117  Ali Carter
 124, 123  David Grace
 123, 106, 101  Xiao Guodong
 123  Li Hang
 123  Mitchell Mann
 122  Chris Wakelin
 119, 102, 101  Yan Bingtao
 119  Oliver Lines
 119  Kyren Wilson
 117, 107, 101  Marco Fu
 115  Wang Yuchen
 113  Dominic Dale
 113  Ashley Hugill
 112  Joe Perry
 110  Ben Woollaston
 108  Jamie Jones
 106  Stuart Carrington
 105  Ricky Walden
 104  Zhou Yuelong
 104  Elliot Slessor
 103  Mark Joyce
 103  Xu Si
 103  Daniel Wells
 103  Gary Wilson
 102  Martin Gould
 101  Michael Holt
 100  Liam Highfield
 100  Craig Steadman
 100  Zhao Xintong

References

Home Nations Series
2017
2017 in snooker
2017 in Scottish sport
2017
December 2017 sports events in the United Kingdom